Delphi Funds is a Norwegian mutual funds manager, established in the mid-1980s as a market analysis and data processing firm. By 1995 the company had shifted its activities to mutual fund- and equity management, and was acquired by the Storebrand group in 2000. Delphi Funds was merged with Storebrand Fondene in 2002 to become part of the Storebrand Asset Management subsidiary.

By 2019, Delphi Funds manages five actively managed unconstrained and concentrated long-only mutual funds: Delphi Global, Delphi Europe, Delphi Nordic, Delphi Norge, and Delphi Kombinasjon.

Delphi Global, Delphi Europe, and Delphi Nordic obtained a marketing licence for Finland and the Netherlands in 2012. In 2018, Iceland was added. These marketing licences mean that Delphi funds are now offered to private and institutional investors in Norway, Sweden, Finland, Iceland and the Netherlands. Outside home market Norway, Delphi Funds only offer their services to institutional clients, including fund platforms.

References

External links
 http://www.delphifunds.com/

Investment management companies of Norway
1995 establishments in Norway